The Wran ministry (1983–1984) or Fifth Wran ministry was the 75th ministry of the New South Wales Government, and was led by the 35th Premier of New South Wales, Neville Wran, representing the Labor Party. It was the fifth of eight consecutive occasions when Wran was Premier.

Background
Wran had been elected to the Legislative Council of New South Wales by a joint sitting of the New South Wales Parliament on 12 March 1970. He was Leader of the Opposition in the Legislative Council from 22 February 1972. He resigned from the council on 19 October 1973 to switch to the Legislative Assembly, successfully contesting the election for Bass Hill, which he would hold until his retirement in 1986. Wran successfully challenged Pat Hills to become Leader of Labor Party and Leader of the Opposition from 3 December 1973 and became Premier following a narrow one seat victory at the 1976 election.

Labor retained government at the 1981 election, gaining an additional 6 seats despite a 2% swing against Labor, giving a majority of 19 seats in the Legislative Assembly and two seats in the Legislative Council.

During the course of this ministry, Wran stood aside for two months from May 1983 while Sir Laurence Street conducted a Royal Commission into claims made by the Australian Broadcasting Corporation current affairs show Four Corners that Chief Magistrate Murray Farquhar had said that Wran wanted charges against Kevin Humphreys to be dismissed. After two months of hearings the Royal Commission found that Farquhar had attempted to pervert the course of justice, but Wran was exonerated and resumed the office of Premier. During this time allegations were made that Rex Jackson, the Minister for Corrective Services, was accepting bribes connected with an early-release scheme, with Wran demanding Jackson's resignation in October 1983.

Composition of ministry
The ministry covers the period from 1 February 1983 when Wran reconfigured his ministry. There were two minor rearrangements of the ministry, with Jackson resigning in October 1983, and George Paciullo was promoted to the ministry in November 1983. The ministry ended on 10 February 1984 when Jack Ferguson, who had been Wran's deputy since 1973, resigned as Deputy Premier announcing that he would not be contesting the next election, and the Sixth Wran ministry was formed.

 
Ministers are members of the Legislative Assembly unless otherwise noted.

See also

Members of the New South Wales Legislative Assembly, 1981–1984
Members of the New South Wales Legislative Council, 1981–1984

Notes

References

 

New South Wales ministries
1983 establishments in Australia
1984 disestablishments in Australia
Australian Labor Party ministries in New South Wales